S scale (or S gauge) is a model railroad scale modeled at 1:64 scale, S scale track gauge (space between the rails) is 22,48 (22,5) mm, 0.885 in. S gauge trains are manufactured in both DC and AC powered varieties. S gauge is not to be confused with toy train standard gauge, a large-scale standard for toy trains in the early part of the 20th century.

History
S scale is one of the oldest model railroading scales. The earliest known 1:64 scale train was constructed from card stock in 1896. The first working models appeared in England in the early 20th century. Modeling in S scale increased in the 1930s and 1940s when CD Models marketed 3/16" model trains.

American Flyer was a manufacturer of standard gauge and O gauge "tinplate" trains, based in Chicago, Illinois. It never produced S scale trains as an independent company. Chicago Flyer was purchased by A.C. Gilbert Co. in the late 1930s. Gilbert began manufacturing S scale trains around 1939 that ran on three rail "O" gauge track. This was known as 3/16" O gauge. Gilbert stopped producing trains during WWII. When the war ended, Gilbert began producing true S scale S gauge trains in 1946 under the American Flyer mark.

The term "S scale" was adopted by the National Model Railroading Association (NMRA) in 1943 to represent that scale that was half of 1 gauge which was built to 1:32 scale. A.C. Gilbert's improvements in 1:64 modeling and promotions of S gauge largely shaped the world of 1:64 modeling today.

As early as 1948, an industrially produced narrow-gauge railway on tracks with a model gauge of 16.5 mm was available from the French company Allard. The vehicles in the scale of 1:60 to be assigned to today's Sm gauge ran with direct current on commercially available H0 gauge centre conductor tracks from the same manufacturer or from competitors, which also has a model gauge of 16.5 mm and centre conductor. The traction units, a steam locomotive and a rail bus (autorail), were also available with a clockwork drive.

S gauge entered what many consider its heyday in the 1950s (although there is more available in S scale today than was available during this period). However, during that period, Lionel outsold American Flyer nearly two-to-one. American Flyer's parent company went out of business and the brand was sold to a holding company that also owned Lionel in 1967.

Lionel re-introduced S gauge trains and accessories under the American Flyer name in 1979. Another S manufacturer, American Models, entered the marketplace in 1981 and is now also one of the major S suppliers. S-Helper Service, another major S gauge manufacturer of locomotives, rolling stock, track and other products, began operations in 1989 and delivered their first S products in 1990. In 2013, S-Helper Service was sold to MTH Electric Trains. And while the S scale market has seen a number of brass model manufacturers, today the major brass model supplier in S scale and S gauge is River Raisin Models. Today's S gauge and S scale modelers have a greater selection and higher quality products, from a wide range of manufacturers, than at any time in the past. In addition to the basics of locomotives, rolling stock, and track, various manufacturers now offer S scale structures, detail parts, figures, other scenic items, bridges, and more.

Terminology
The terms "scale" and "gauge" are often confused. Strictly speaking, scale is the ratio of the size of a model to that of its prototype and gauge is the distance between the track railheads. In the case of S scale, the proportion is 1:64 or 3/16 of an inch modeling 1 foot. Standard S gauge track has a spacing of 7/8 inch.

Narrow gauge
Sn3½ or Sn42 gauge -  gauge on  gauge track (the same as HO gauge)
Sm – 1 m gauge on 16.5 mm; Continental European.
Sn3 -  gauge on  gauge track.

Associations
The S scale SIG is an NMRA-affiliated special interest group dedicated to promoting and providing information on scale model railroading at 1:64. The National Association of S Gaugers serves as an organization to promote all forms of S gauge model railroading. The S Scale Model Railway Society also works to promote the scale in the UK.

Notable layouts
The largest S scale layout in the United States is the Cincinnati in Motion exhibit at the Cincinnati Museum Center at Union Terminal.

See also
 Rail transport modelling
 Rail transport modelling scales

External links

 National Association of S Gaugers (NASG)

References

Model railroad scales
Scale model scales